Rybaxis is a genus of ant-loving beetles in the family Staphylinidae. There are at least 20 described species in Rybaxis.

Species
These 20 species belong to the genus Rybaxis:

 Rybaxis appressicornis Park, 1956
 Rybaxis arkansana Fall, 1927
 Rybaxis bifalxa Park, 1956
 Rybaxis brevis Oke, 1928
 Rybaxis clavata (Brendel, 1865)
 Rybaxis conjuncta (LeConte, 1849)
 Rybaxis geminata Fall, 1927
 Rybaxis gigas (Baudi di Selve, 1869)
 Rybaxis glabrella (Schaufuss, 1890)
 Rybaxis laminata (Motschulsky, 1836)
 Rybaxis longicornis (Leach, 1817)
 Rybaxis mystica Casey, 1894
 Rybaxis obliquedens Fall, 1927
 Rybaxis patris (Schaufuss, 1891)
 Rybaxis phantasma Park, 1958
 Rybaxis transversa Fall, 1927
 Rybaxis truncaticornis (Brendel, 1890)
 Rybaxis valida (Brendel, 1890)
 Rybaxis varicornis (Brendel, 1890)
 Rybaxis veterum (Schaufuss, 1890)

References

Further reading

External links

 

Pselaphinae
Articles created by Qbugbot